Mark Christopher Payne (born June 17, 1988) is an American professional basketball player. He is left-handed, 6'8" (2.03 m) tall, and he can play as either a shooting guard-small forward, or as a point guard-point forward.

College career
After playing high school basketball at St. Mary's, in Stockton, California, Payne played college basketball at the University of California, Davis, with the UC Davis Aggies.

Professional career
Payne began his pro career in 2011, with the Spanish Second Division club Axarquía. He moved to the Spanish First Division club Málaga during the 2011–12 season. He signed with the Greek League club, Panionios, in the summer of 2012. In September 2013, he signed with PAOK Thessaloniki for the 2013–14 season.

In June 2014, he signed a one-year deal with Chalons-Reims of the French LNB Pro A. On June 30, 2015, he signed a two-year deal with Limoges CSP.

References

External links
Euroleague.net Profile
Eurobasket.com Profile
Greek Basket League Profile
Draftexpress.com Profile
Spanish League Profile 
UC Davis College Bio
ESPN College Stats

1988 births
Living people
American expatriate basketball people in France
American expatriate basketball people in Greece
American expatriate basketball people in Spain
American men's basketball players
Baloncesto Málaga players
Basketball players from Texas
CB Axarquía players
Liga ACB players
Limoges CSP players
Panionios B.C. players
P.A.O.K. BC players
Point guards
Reims Champagne Basket players
Shooting guards
Small forwards
Sportspeople from Lubbock, Texas
UC Davis Aggies men's basketball players